Teresa Ndanga (also known as Teresa Chirwa-Ndanga; born 29 April 1982) is a Malawian investigative journalist. Teresa is the first female chairperson of the Media Institute of Southern Africa MISA Malawi Chapter, and the recipient of the 2010 CNN/Multichoice Health and Medical reporting award. In 2012, she received the MISA Malawi Investigative Journalist award electronic media  while in 2013, she received the Overall Journalist of the Year award for the same award. In 2015, she was listed among the top 10 women to watch in media by  Media Institute of Southern Africa.

Background and education 

Teresa Ndanga was born on 29 April 1982 in Zimbabwe. Her family relocated to Malawi when she was nine years old. In 2007  she completed her Bachelor of Arts degree in Journalism at the Malawi Polytechnic Institute. In 2012, she was awarded the Journalism for Human Rights Fisher Fellowship through Massey College in Canada. In 2015, she attained a master's degree in Public Administration from Harvard Kennedy School in the United States.

Career 
Teresa's career in journalism began in 2005 as a student intern at Zodiak Broadcasting station. She was later employed by the media house upon her graduation from the Malawi Polytechnic in 2007. After receiving the 2010 CNN/Multichoice Health and Medical Reporting Award, Teresa was promoted from being a reporter to an editor at Zodiak Broadcasting station. She progressed at Zodiak Broadcasting station to become the director of news and current affairs. During her tenure at Zodiak Broadcasting Station, the media house received the MISA Best Electronic Media House Award for six consecutive years.  Teresa received the MISA Investigative Journalist Award for Electronic  Media in 2012, 2013 and 2014. She also holds the 2013 MISA Overall Journalist of the Year Award. In 2017, Teresa was named the first female chairperson of  the Media Institute of Southern Africa Malawi chapter. She currently heads the Public Relations at AHL Malawi Group.

References 

Malawian journalists
Living people
University of Malawi alumni
Harvard Kennedy School alumni
Malawian women journalists
Zimbabwean people
1982 births